Cinepoly Records (新藝寶) is a Hong Kong-based record label founded in 1985. It was a subsidiary of PolyGram Records and the film company Cinema City. Ownership of Cinepoly Records  switched to Universal Music Group after Universal acquired PolyGram Records in 1998 and albums are distributed by Universal Music Hong Kong starting from 2017.

Many of Hong Kong's popstars and brands were under this label including:
 Joe Lee (1986-1987)
 Leslie Cheung (1987-1990)
 Beyond (1988-1991)
 Tai Chi (1985-1986,1999-2001)
 Louis Lau (1990-1991)
 Brian Cheng (1991-1993)
 Pat Lew (1991-1994)
 William So (1993-2003)
 John Wu (1993-1994)
 Faye Wong (1989-1997)
 Softhard (1991-1996)
 Priscilla Chan (1998-2001)
 Julian Cheung (2000-2004)
 Miriam Yeung (2001-2003)
 Eason Chan (2004-2017)
 Kay Tse (2007-2012)
 Mr. (2008-2016)
 Prudence Liew  (2008-2017)
 Swing (2009-2012)
 Kary Ng (2011-2017)
 Pong Nan (2014-2017)

See also
 List of record labels

Sources

 Universal Music Group

Hong Kong record labels
Record labels established in 1985
Labels distributed by Universal Music Group
Pop record labels
IFPI members
1985 establishments in Hong Kong